Karak syndrome is a neurological degenerative disorder involving excess cerebral iron accumulation. The family who the disease was discovered in their siblings lived in Karak, a town in southern Jordan. It is characterized by ataxia, inverted feet (talipes calcaneovarus), dysarthric scanning speech with dystonic features, dystonic movement of the tongue and facial muscles and choreiform movement was present in both upper and lower limbs, being more marked in the lower limbs, along with dystonic posture of the distal feet, bradykinesia
present in both upper and lower limbs, dysmetria, dysdiadochokinesia, and intentional tremor were bilateral and symmetrical.

See also
 Neurodegeneration with brain iron accumulation
 Iron overload

References

External links 

Syndromes affecting the nervous system
Syndromes with musculoskeletal abnormalities